Təzəkənd (also, Tazakend and Ortlu-Tazakend) is a village in the Sharur District of Nakhchivan, Azerbaijan.  The village forms part of the municipality of Maxta.

References 

Populated places in Sharur District